Sir David Neil Macfarlane (born 7 May 1936) is a Conservative Party politician in the United Kingdom.

Political career
Macfarlane first stood for Parliament in 1970 at East Ham North, but was defeated by Labour's Reg Prentice. He was elected Member of Parliament for Sutton and Cheam in February 1974, regaining the seat from the Liberal Graham Tope who had beaten him in a by-election just 14 months earlier.

Macfarlane held some ministerial posts, including Education and Science and the Arts (1979–1981), and the Environment and Sport (1981–1985).

After Parliament
Macfarlane stood down from Parliament in 1992, and was succeeded by Lady Olga Maitland. He wrote, with Michael Herd, a memoir of his time as sports minister, Sport and Politics: a world divided (Willow, 1986). He was knighted in the 1988 New Year Honours.

References 
Times Guide to the House of Commons, 1987 and 1992 editions

1936 births
Living people
People educated at Bancroft's School
Conservative Party (UK) MPs for English constituencies
Knights Bachelor
Politicians awarded knighthoods
UK MPs 1974
UK MPs 1974–1979
UK MPs 1979–1983
UK MPs 1983–1987
UK MPs 1987–1992